Methods of Execution is the third and latest full-length album by Brodequin.

Track listing
 "Slaves to the Pyre"
 "The Gridiron"
 "The Red Theatre"
 "Pressing to Plead"
 "Tyburn Field"
 "Durance Vile"
 "Lingering Existence"
 "Cast Into Torment"
 "Verdrinken"
 "Punishment Without Mercy"
 "Methods of Execution"

References

2004 albums
Brodequin albums